The 1895–96 Irish Cup was the sixteenth edition of the premier knock-out cup competition in Irish football. 

Distillery won the tournament for the sixth time, defeating Glentoran 3–1 in the final.

Results
Dublin University, Milltown, Distillery, Belfast Celtic, Linfield, Moyola Park, Glentoran and Cliftonville given byes into the second round.

First round

|}

Second round

|}

Third round

|}

Replays

|}

Second replay

|}

Semi-finals

|}

Final

References

External links
 Northern Ireland Cup Finals. Rec.Sport.Soccer Statistics Foundation (RSSSF)

Irish Cup seasons
1895–96 domestic association football cups
1895–96 in Irish association football